The Thundering Trail is a 1951 American Western film produced and directed by Ron Ormond starring Lash LaRue and Al "Fuzzy" St. John.  It was the ninth of LaRue's films for Ormond's Western Adventures Productions Inc. The film was the third to be released by Howco, Ron Ormond's new film company composed of Ormond and drive-in movie owners Joy N. Houck and J. Francis White, and Ormond's second film as director.  The  screenplay is co-written by Ormond's wife June Carr and Associate Producer Ira S. Webb. The film features a large amount of footage from previous Ormond LaRue Westerns.

Plot
The President of the United States appoints Judge Tom Emery, who was under the President's command in the American Civil War to be the new Territorial Governor in order to clean up the outlaw problem.  Marshal Lash and Deputy Fuzzy escort the Judge and his daughter to Capitol City but a large gang of outlaws with unsuspected informers attempt to stop them.

Cast
 Lash La Rue as Marshal Lash LaRue
 Al St. John as Fuzzy Q. Jones
 Archie R. Twitchell as Gov. Tom Emery
 Sally Anglim as Betty Jo Emery
 Ray Bennett as Ed West
 Sue Hussey as Sue 
 Mary Lou Webb as Miss Smith 
 Clarke Stevens as Clark 
 John L. Cason as Conway 
 Jimmy Martin as Frank
 George Chesebro as Charlie Jones  
 Bud Osborne as Joe
 Terry Frost as Schaeffer 
 Reed Howes  as Schaeffer's Brother

References

External links

1951 films
American Western (genre) films
1951 Western (genre) films
American black-and-white films
Films directed by Ron Ormond
1950s English-language films
1950s American films